(born July 9, 1990) is a Japanese actor, television, and theatre actor best known for his role as  Higen, the young nephew of samurai leader Katsumoto, in the 2003 film The Last Samurai.

Life and career 
Born in Fukuoka, Fukuoka Prefecture, Japan, on July 9, 1990, Ikematsu landed his first film role in the blockbuster hit The Last Samurai at the age of 13. He has since gone on to star in four feature-length films in Japan. Ikematsu graduated from Noma Junior High School in Minami-ku, Fukuoka City,  Fukuoka in March 2006.

Filmography

Film 

 The Last Samurai - Higen (2003)
 Tetsujin 28: The Movie - Shōtarō (2005)
 Otoko-tachi no Yamato - Atsushi (2005)
 Udon - Shōta Mizusawa (2006)
 Yoru no Pikunikku - Junya Sakaki (2006)
 Genghis Khan: To the Ends of the Earth and Sea (2007)
 Sand Chronicles - Daigo Kitamura (2008)
 Dive!! - Yōichi (2008)
 Ike-chan to Boku - Boku (2009)
 Shin-san - Mamoru (2009)
 Looking up at the Half-Moon - Yūichi (2010)
 Drucker in the Dug-Out - Jirō (2011)
 Ike! Danshi Kōkō Engekibu - Kaji (2011)
 Yokomichi Yonosuke (2013)
 Love's Whirlpool - Isamu (the NEET) (2014)
 Pale Moon (2014)
 The Vancouver Asahi - Frank Nojima (2014)
 My Hawaiian Discovery (2014)
 Our Family (2014)
 Mozu (2015)
 Our Huff and Puff Journey (2015)
 A Cappella - Wataru Dōmoto (2016)
 The Shell Collector (2016)
 Destruction Babies (2016)
 After the Storm (2016)
 Someone's Xylophone (2016)
 Seto & Utsumi - Utsumi (2016)
 Death Note: Light Up the New World - Ryūzaki (2016)
 The Long Excuse - Kishimoto (2016)
 The Tokyo Night Sky Is Always the Densest Shade of Blue - Shinji (2017)
 Samurai's Promise (2018)
 You, Your, Yours (2018)
 Shoplifters (2018)
 Killing (2018)
 We Are Little Zombies (2019)
 Miyamoto - Hiroshi Miyamoto (2019)
 Almost a Miracle - Yōhei Yoshitaka (2019)
 A Girl Missing - Kazumichi (2019)
 Talking the Pictures - Buntarō Futagawa (2019)
 The Asian Angel (2021)
 1921 (2021)
 Yanagawa (2021)
 Just Remembering - Teruo (2022)
 Shin Kamen Rider - Takeshi Hongo (2023)
 Okiku and the World (2023)

Television 

 Yoshitsune (2005) - young Minamoto no Yoritomo 
 Shinsengumi!! Hijikata Toshizō Saigo no Ichi-nichi (2006) - Ichimura Tetsunosuke
 Fūrin Kazan (2007) - young Takeda Shingen and Suwa Katsuyori
 Inochi no Shima (2009) - Tōru 
 The Three Musketeers (2009-2010) - D'Artagnan (voice)
 15 Sai no Shiganhei (2010) - Masami Fujiyama
 Q10 - Takehiko Kubo (2010)
 Tomehane! Suzuri Kōkō Shodōbu (2010) - Yukari Ōe
 Mozu (2014) - Shingai Kazuhiko
 Sherlock Holmes (2014-2015) - Jack Stapleton (voice)
 Death Note: New Generation (2016) - Ryūzaki
 Kindaichi Kosuke Tōjō! (2016) - Kosuke Kindaichi (2016)
 Silver and Gold (2017) - Tetsuo Morita
 The Supporting Actors (2017) - Himself
 Miyamoto kara Kimi e (2018) - Hiroshi Miyamoto 
 Anata no Soba de Ashita ga Warau (2021)
 Bullets, Bones and Blocked Noses (2021) - Ippei Aoba
 Modern Love Tokyo (2022)
 Crayon Shin-chan (2023) - Takeshi Hongo (voice)

Video Games 
Uncharted 3: Drake's Deception (2011, Japanese dub) - young Nathan Drake

Stage 
 The Lion King - Young Simba (2001)

References

External links 
 Official profile at Horipro 

Living people
1990 births
21st-century Japanese male actors
Japanese male film actors
Japanese male child actors
Actors from Fukuoka Prefecture
People from Fukuoka
Nihon University alumni
Horipro artists